Norbourne Estates is a home rule-class city in Jefferson County, Kentucky, United States. The population was 441 at the 2010 census.

Geography
Norbourne Estates is located in north-central Jefferson County at  (38.246971, -85.647086).

Demographics

As of the census of 2000, there were 461 people, 171 households, and 129 families residing in the city. The racial makeup of the city was 98.48% White, 0.22% Asian, and 1.30% from two or more races. Hispanic or Latino of any race were 0.65% of the population.

There were 171 households, out of which 47.4% had children under the age of 18 living with them, 63.7% were married couples living together, 9.4% had a female householder with no husband present, and 24.0% were non-families. 21.6% of all households were made up of individuals, and 12.9% had someone living alone who was 65 years of age or older. The average household size was 2.70 and the average family size was 3.17.

In the city, the population was spread out, with 32.5% under the age of 18, 3.3% from 18 to 24, 28.4% from 25 to 44, 23.6% from 45 to 64, and 12.1% who were 65 years of age or older. The median age was 39 years. For every 100 females, there were 88.2 males. For every 100 females age 18 and over, there were 88.5 males.

The median income for a household in the city was $109,028, and the median income for a family was $120,974. Males had a median income of $68,750 versus $48,750 for females. The per capita income for the city was $46,980. About 0.7% of families and 1.0% of the population were below the poverty line, including 2.1% of those under age 18 and none of those age 65 or over.

References

External links
City of Norbourne Estates official website

Cities in Jefferson County, Kentucky
Cities in Kentucky
Populated places established in 1950
1950 establishments in Kentucky